The Canning River flows through parts of the North Slope in the U.S. state of Alaska. The river begins in the Franklin Mountains of the Brooks Range in the northeastern part of the state. It flows generally north for  through the Arctic National Wildlife Refuge and enters Camden Bay west of Kaktovik on the Beaufort Sea.

See also

 List of rivers of Alaska

References

Rivers of North Slope Borough, Alaska
Rivers of Alaska